Minari (2020) is an American comedy-drama film written and directed by Lee Isaac Chung. The film stars Steven Yeun, Han Ye-ri, Alan Kim, Noel Kate Cho, Youn Yuh-jung and Will Patton. A semi-autobiographical take on Chung's upbringing, the plot follows a family of South Korean immigrants who try to make it in rural America during the 1980s.

The film premiered at the 2020 Sundance Film Festival where it received the U.S. Dramatic Grand Jury Prize and the U.S. Dramatic Audience Award. It was named one of the ten best films of 2020 by the American Film Institute and the National Board of Review. It also received 3 Screen Actors Guild Award nominations and 10 Critics' Choice Movie Awards nominations.

Accolades

See also
 2020 in film

References

External links
 

Minari